Eric Forsberg (born December 16, 1959) is an American writer. He wrote and directed the feature film Mega Piranha, as well as the writer of the feature film Snakes on a Train, one of the first mockbusters produced and released by The Asylum. He also wrote the screenplays for 30,000 Leagues Under the Sea and War of the Worlds 2: The Next Wave, also for The Asylum.  He directed the film Alien Abduction which aired on Sci Fi Channel, as well as Night of the Dead which aired on Chiller TV. Other writer and director credits include the political thriller Torture Room, and the stoner comedy Sex Pot as well as Monster, Almighty Thor, Arachnoquake, and Age of the Hobbits. He also worked as a Co-Producer and assistant director on numerous films for Christopher Coppola and Alain Silver, including White Nights, Bel Air, and Palmer's Pickup. In his early years Forsberg was an improvisational comedy instructor at The Players Workshop and The Second City Training Center in Chicago.

Biography 
Eric Forsberg was born in Chicago on December 16, 1959. He is the son of improv director Josephine Forsberg and filmmaker Rolf Forsberg.

Before moving to Hollywood in 1997, Forsberg worked as a writer and director in the Chicago theater scene. The original musical, Knat Scatt Private Eye, with Steve Carell, was among his more successful productions. Forsberg also taught improvisation at The Players Workshop and The Second City Training Center where his students included Stephen Colbert, Amy Sedaris, Tim Meadows, and Rachel Dratch. Forsberg also worked to create a school/family concert for the Chicago Symphony Orchestra. His performance credits include Silas Brimfire at the Bristol Renaissance Faire.

Soon after Forsberg arrived in Los Angeles, he began working with director Christopher Coppola and producer Alain Silver. Following that he started writing screenplays and directing feature films for David Michael Latt and David Rimawi at The Asylum. Eric Forsberg was a founding member of The Second City Training Center in Los Angeles where his students included Brian Stepanek and Masi Oka. Forsberg lives in Southern California with his wife Karen and his daughter Lola. He is a founding member of the production company Cerebral Experiment.

Filmography

Writer and director 
Mega Piranha – (2010), Syfy, The Asylum
Sex Pot – (2009), The Asylum
Monster – (2007), The Asylum
 Torture Room – (2007), Cerebral Experiment
Night of the Dead – (2006), Cerebral Experiment
Alien Abduction (film) – (2005), The Asylum
Andy – (1985), Players Workshop

Writer 
Age of the Hobbits (2012), The Asylum
Arachnoquake (2012 – story), Active Entertainment/SyFy
Almighty Thor (uncredited) – (2011), The Asylum/SyFy
MILF (story credit)- (2010), The Asylum
War of the Worlds 2 – (2008), The Asylum
30,000 Leagues Under the Sea – (2007), The Asylum
Snakes on a Train – (2006), The Asylum
Blackhorse: History of the 11th Cavalry – (2005), US Army
The Aquanauts (TV)- (1999–2000), Village Roadshow, Animal Planet

Stage

Playwright and director 
PLAYS & MUSICALS FOR YOUNG AUDIENCES
Jimmy Sweeter Visits Candyland – Children's Theater of The Second City – (1980)
The Wondrous Tales of Baby Clown Foo – Children's Theater of The Second City – (1981)
Tales of Young King Arthur – Children's Theater of The Second City – (1981)
Santa and the Christmas Gnomes – Children's Theater of The Second City – (1981)
Swash Buckler and the Gems of Chaos – Children's Theater of The Second City – (1982)
The Adventures of Sinbad – Children's Theater of The Second City – (1983)
Knat Scatt Private Eye (children's version) – Children's Theater of The Second City – (1984)
Monkey Kings and Other Things – Children's Theater of The Second City – (1986)
Mississippi Mark and his Crazy Caliope Company – Children's Theater of The Second City – (1987)
The Fast Paced Comedy of the King some Clowns and a Couple of Bad Guys – Children's Theater of The Second City – (1988)
Dr. Stagemaster's Amazing Imagination Machine – Candlelight Dinner Theater – (1989)
Fantastic Fantasy Factory – Candlelight Dinner Theater – (1990)
MenuMania – Candlelight Dinner Theater – (1992–93)

Plays and musicals
And So They Fell – Performer's Arena – (1981)
A Dozen Idiots (co-writer) – Performer's Arena – (1981)
Knat Scatt Private Eye – Theatre Building Chicago/Players Workshop/Avalon Theater Company – (1986)
A Tribute to Vincent van Gogh by the Impressionists' Circle – Performer's Arena – (1988)
Time Machine – Theatre Building Chicago/New Tuners – (1994)
Cannibal – Theatre Building Chicago/Writer's Bloc New Play Festival – (1995)

Director 
The Bacchae (by Euripides – Performer's Arena – (1981)
The Homecoming of Beorhtnoth Beorhthelm's Son (by JRR Tolkien) – Performer's Arena – (1981)
Rhinocéros (by Eugène Ionesco) – Performer's Arena – (1982)
A Thousand Clowns – Performer's Arena – 1983
The Man in the Glass Booth (by Robert Shaw – Performer's Arena – (1984)
Marat Sade (by Peter Weiss) – Performer's Arena – (1984)
What the Butler Saw (by Joe Orton) – Performer's Arena – (1985)
Sketch Comedy Revues/Grad Shows – The Players Workshop performed on The Second City stage – (1983–1992)
Fright Fest – (1991–1996), Six Flags Great America, JPM Productions, Inc.
Bristol Renaissance Faire – (1990–1997)
Comedy Revues at the Second City Training Center Chicago – The Second City – (1987–1992)
Comedy Revues at the Second City Training Center Los Angeles – The Improv – (1999–2003)

References

External links 

1966 births
Living people
Writers from Chicago
American male screenwriters
American film directors
20th-century American dramatists and playwrights
Renaissance fair performers
American male dramatists and playwrights
Screenwriters from Illinois
20th-century American male writers